Charles-Jean Grandmougin (17 January 1850 – 28 April 1930) was a French poet and playwright. He lived in Paris. Two of his poems appeared in the third and final volume of Le Parnasse contemporain (1876). His poetry has been set as songs by composers including Fauré, Chaminade, Boulanger, Pierné and Bizet. He was more well known as a librettist and translator for operas and oratorios. He wrote the libretto for César Franck's opera Hulda, set in 11th-century Norway, and based on the play Lame Hulda (1858) by Norwegian writer Bjørnstjerne Bjørnson. He also wrote the libretto for La Vierge, an oratorio by Jules Massenet.

Major works
 Esquisse sur Richard Wagner (1873)
 Les Siestes, poems (1874)
 Prométhée, drame antique (1878)
 Le Tasse, symphonie dramatique (1878)
 Nouvelles Poésies (1880)
 Souvenirs d’Anvers (1881)
 Orphée, drame antique en vers (1882)
 Caïn, biblical drama in verse
 Poèmes d’amour (1884)
 Rimes de combat (1886)
 À pleines voiles, poems (1888)
 L’Enfant Jésus, mystère en 5 parties et en vers
 Le Christ, sacred drama in verse, couronné par l’Académie française (1892)
 L’Empereur, epic drama in verse, in 13 scenes (1893)
 De la Terre aux Étoiles, poems (1897)
 Visions chrétiennes, récits en vers (1899)
 Le Réveillon, drama in one act, in verse
 La Vouivre, poème franc-comtois
 Les Serfs du Jura, drama in verse
 Aryénis, drama in verse
 La Chanson du village
 Medjour, story of the supernatural
 Les Heures divines, poems (1894)
 La Forêt mystérieuse, booklet
 Le Naufrage de l’amour, poem
 Contes d’aujourd’hui, prose
 Terre de France, poem
 Contes en prose
 Dernières Promenades (1910)
 Les Sirènes (1911)

References 

Johnson, Graham (2009). Gabriel Fauré: the songs and their poets, Guildhall School of Music and Drama (London, England), p. 120

External links 
Johnson, Graham (2009). Gabriel Fauré: the songs and their poets, Guildhall School of Music and Drama (London, England), p.120
Gérard WALCH, Anthologie des poètes français contemporains, 1924.

1850 births
1930 deaths
French librettists
French opera librettists
19th-century French poets
People from Vesoul
French male poets
19th-century French dramatists and playwrights
French male non-fiction writers
19th-century French translators